The front homosexuel d'action révolutionnaire (FHAR) was a loose Parisian movement founded in 1971, resulting from a union between lesbian feminists and gay activists. If the movement could be considered to have leaders, they were Guy Hocquenghem and Françoise d'Eaubonne, while other members included Christine Delphy, Daniel Guérin, and Laurent Dispot. It had disappeared by 1976. Surviving early activists also include painter and surrealistic photographer Yves Hernot, now living in Sydney, Australia.

The FHAR are known for having given radical visibility to homosexuals during the 1970s in the wake of student and proletarian uprisings of 1968, which had given little space to the liberation of women and homosexuals.  Breaking with older homosexual groups which were more hidden and sometimes conservative, they asserted the subversion of the bourgeois and hetero–patriarchal state, as well as the inversion of chauvinistic and homophobic values common of the left and extreme left.

The outrageous aspect (vis-à-vis the authorities) of the male sexual encounters which were held, and the increasing prevalence of the men (which inevitably gradually obscured the feminist questions and lesbian voices), eventually brought about the group's disintegration.  In its wake appeared the Groupe de libération homosexuelle (GLH) and the Gouines rouges within the Mouvement de Libération des Femmes (MLF).

Birth and beginning 
The group was originally formed by an alliance of feminists of the MLF and lesbians coming from the association Arcadie, who were joined by homosexuals in February 1971.  But the trigger would be a poster of "Comité d'action pédérastique révolutionnaire" (English: Committee of Revolutionary Pederastic Action) posted at the Sorbonne during May 1968. The group organized meetings at the École Nationale Supérieure des Beaux-Arts in Paris. 

On 5 March 1971, the group interrupted a meeting against the right of abortion, and on 10 March it attracted public attention by disturbing and stopping a broadcast of Ménie Gregoire on the topic of the homosexuality being broadcast on Radio Luxembourg.

The name which they gave themselves, "Front Homosexuel d'Action Révolutionnaire", reduced to initialism FHAR, was nevertheless registered officially as "Fédération Humaniste Anti-Raciste".  The group also communicated through the leftist newspaper, Tout.  It asserted the sexual freedom of all individuals. A declaration refers to Manifeste des 343 salopes (English: Manifesto of the 343 sluts):

This work was seized by the police, and the director of publication, Jean-Paul Sartre, was prosecuted.  However, the FHAR dropped in on the Constitutional Council to declare the attacks on freedom of expression unconstitutional, and in July 1971 the investigation was stopped.

FHAR denounced heterosexism and the medicalization of homosexuality. In 1971, they disturbed the international Congress of sexology in Sanremo. They also intervened in communist political meetings, in particular with Mutualité where Jacques Duclos said to them: "Allez vous faire soigner, bande de pédérastes, le PCF est sain!" (English: Go get yourself cured, you band of pederasts; the PCF is healthy!)

Dissension 
The growing power of men in the group led many women of the FHAR to break off, forming the Gouines rouges splinter group in June 1971 ("gouines" is slang French for "Lesbian"), with the aim of fighting more against sexism and it male chauvinism/androcracy.

Other groups became conspicuous: Gazolines, the newspapers Fléau social and Antinorm. They still published a Rapport contre la normalité in 1971 (reed. QuestionDeGenre/GKC, 2013) and one thick special number of the review Research directed by Félix Guattari in 1973.

All these groups were, however, recognized under the slogans of the FHAR ("Prolétaires de tous les pays, caressez-vous !" / Workers of the world, caress yourselves! ("caressez-vous" also being a French slang expression meaning "to masturbate"), "Lesbiennes et pédés, arrêtons de raser les murs !" / Lesbians and fags, let us stop keeping a low profile) and the fight against the "hétéro-flics" (hetero–cops).

Decline and posterity 
Members of the group started to leave: Daniel Guérin because of excesses by Gazolines on the occasion of the burial of a Maoist killed by a vigilante in 1972, but also Françoise d'Eaubonne, who saw it as no longer anything but a place for flirting.

The police banned the meetings at the école des Beaux-Arts in February 1974, and FHAR gave up its spectacular actions.

The FHAR has descendants.  Its claims, quite different from the call for social tolerance by the group Arcadie Club, were followed by homosexual associations and groups in the 1980s, such as Universités d’été euroméditerranéennes des homosexualités and Comité d'Urgence Anti-Répression Homosexuelle (CUARH) in 1979, or the magazine Gai pied.

The movement's radicalism and high politicisation were also taken up by LGBT movements in the 1990s, inspiring in part the current queer movement in the United States of America and France.

References

See also

Filmography 
 FHAR (1971), a 26-minute black and white documentary of the first meetings and demonstrations of the FHAR, by Carole Roussopoulos
 Race d'Ep, Un siècle d'image de l'homosexualité (1979), docudrama by Lionel Soukaz and Guy Hocquenghem
 Bleu, blanc, rose (2000), documentary by Yves Jeuland on the French gay movement
 My Super 8 Season Ma saison super 8 (2005), directed by Alessandro Avellis (2005), a drama inspired by the FHAR
 The revolution of desire La révolution du désir (2006), documentary directed by Alessandro Avellis

Bibliography

Stemming from FHAR
 « Libre disposition de notre corps », Tout, n° 12, 23 avril 1971.
 FHAR, Rapport contre la normalité, Paris, Champ libre, 1971. Reed. QuestionDeGenre/GKC, 2013.
 Dossier « Trois milliards de pervers. Grande encyclopédie des homosexualités », Recherches, mars 1973.

On the FHAR
 Jacques Girard, Le Mouvement homosexuel en France, 1945-1981, Paris, Syros, 1981.
 
 Masques, revue des Homosexualités, n°9/10, Paris, 1981.
 Françoise d'Eaubonne, « Le FHAR, origines et illustration », la Revue h, n° 2, 1996.
 Didier Eribon, « FHAR », Dictionnaire des cultures gays et lesbiennes, Larousse, 2003.
 Michael Sibalis, « Gay Liberation Comes to France: The Front Homosexuel d’Action Révolutionnaire (FHAR) », French History and Civilization, 2005.

See also 
 New social movements
 LGBT social movements

1970s in LGBT history
Lesbian feminism
Lesbian history
LGBT history in France
LGBT organizations in France
Organizations established in 1971
LGBT culture in Paris
1971 establishments in France